Man, Woman & Marriage is a 1921 American silent drama film produced and directed by Allen Holubar and starring Dorothy Phillips. It was released through Associated First National Pictures. It is also known under the title Man-Woman-Marriage.

Cast
Dorothy Phillips as Victoria
Ralph Lewis as The Father
Margaret Mann as The Mother
James Kirkwood as David Courtney
Robert Cain as Bruce Schuyler
J. Barney Sherry as Henshaw
Shannon Day as Bobo
Frances Parks as Milly
Emily Chichester as Jerry

unbilled
Bernice Gevurtz (uncredited)
Robert Livingston (uncredited)
Ramon Novarro as Dancer (uncredited)
Derelys Perdue (uncredited)

Production
The film attracted publicity in 1920, months before its release, because 160 of the extras in its battle scene filed injury reports with California's State Industrial Commission on September 14, 1920.  Reportedly, nine of the participants were hospitalized after being hurt during the filming near Chatsworth, California.

Reception
In his review for the first incarnation of Life, Robert E. Sherwood called the film "the world's worst movie". Sherwood described the film as "a grotesque hodgepodge about woman's rights through the ages (interminable ages they are, too) with a great deal of ham allegory and cheap religious drool, used to cloud the real motif — which is sex appeal."

Preservation status
The film is preserved in the EYE Institut collection Filmmuseum, Amsterdam.

Image gallery

References

External links

Man-Woman-Marriage, starring Dorothy Phillips: Big doings on the Iverson Movie Ranch way back in 1920!

1921 films
American silent feature films
Films directed by Allen Holubar
First National Pictures films
American black-and-white films
1920s American films